The Marty Nunataks are a group comprising about six nunataks in the western part of the Britannia Range, Antarctica. They are named after Jerry W. Marty, who was involved in Antarctica from 1969, first as a construction worker at South Pole Station, and later, from 1995 to 2001, was engaged in on-site contract support to the Office of Polar Programs, National Science Foundation, as a Construction/Operations and Maintenance Coordinator for South Pole Station modernization. The name was given in 2001.

External links 

 Marty Nunataks on USGS website
 Marty Nunataks on AADC website
 Marty Nunataks on SCAR website
 AMERICANS HONOUR ANTARCTIC VETERANS in 2001

References 

Nunataks of Oates Land